Sultan Hidayatullah II of Banjar, known also as Pangeran Hidayatullah, Sultan Hidayat or simply Hidayat (born in Martapura, South Kalimantan, 1822, died in Cianjur, Jawa Barat, 24 November 1904), was a sultan-pretender of the Sultanate of Banjar and a leader of the Banjarese rebels in the Banjarmasin War.

Personal life 
Pangeran Hidayatullah was born in 1822 in Martapura. His father was Sultan Muda Abdurrahman son of Sultan Adam Al-Watsiq Billah, and his mother was Ratu Siti binti Pangeran Mangku Bumi Nata bin Sultan Sulaiman.

In 1852 the Sultan's heir-apparent died, and the Dutch replaced him by the illegitimate grandson Tamjied Illah.
In vain, Sultan Adam and many nobles in 1853 sent an embassy to Batavia, pointing out iniquities perpetrated by the Dutch-designated heir and appealing for the Dutch to recognise instead Hidayatullah - a younger but legitimate son.
Sultan Adam died in 1857 and was succeeded by Tamjied Illah. There ensued a struggle for power between Tamjied Illah and Hidayatullah, which divided the population, much of which stood behind Hidayatullah and highly resented the Dutch sponsoring of Tamjied Illah. In early 1859, a revolt against Tamjied's rule broke out and the Royal Netherlands East Indies Army intervened on his behalf, but in June 1859 Tamjied stepped down. Unable to find a suitable successor, the Dutch colonial government decided to annex the Sultanate of Banjar in June 1860. In early 1862, Hidayat surrendered to Dutch commander Verspijck in exchange for permission to settle on the island of Java. The last rebels surrendered in 1863. 

Hidayat died in Cianjur, Jawa Barat, 24 November 1904.

Issues 
 Putri Bintang (daughter of Ratu Mas Bandara)
 Putri Bulan (daughter of Siti Aer Mas)
 Ratu Kusuma Indra (son of Siti Aer Mas)
 Pangeran Abdul Rahman (son of Ratu Mas Ratna Kediri)
 Ratu Saleha (daughter of Nyai Rahamah)
 Gusti Sari Banun (daughter of Nyai Rahamah)
 Pangeran Sasra Kasuma (son of Nyai Noerain)
 Gusti Muhammad Saleh (son of Nyai Arpiah)
 Pangeran Amarullah (son of Nyai Etjech , Cianjur)
 Pangeran Alibasah (son of Nyai Etjech, Cianjur)

References

Sources 
 1936. Dr. J. Eisenberger. Kroniek der Zuider -en Oosterafdeling van Borneo. Liem Hwat Sing, Bandjermasin.
 1892. Egbert Broer Kielstra. De ondergang van het Bandjermasinse Rijk. Overdruk uit de Indische Gids, jaargang 1891. E.J. Brill. Leiden.
 1859. Wolter Robert van Hoëvell. De expeditie tegen Boni en de ramoen van Bandjermasin. Tijdschrift voor Nederlands Indie. 21 ste jaargang
 1886. H.G.J.L. Meyners Bijdragen tot de geschiedenis van het Bandjermasinsche Rijk. 1863-1866. E.J. Brill. Leiden
 1865. Willem Adriaan van Rees. De Bandjermasinse Krijg. 1859-1863. Twee delen. D.A. Thieme. Arnhem.
 1867. W.A. van Rees. De Bandjermasinsche Krijg van 1859-1863 nader toegelicht. D.A. Thieme. Arnhem.
 1897. J.P. Schoemaker. Verhalen uit de grote en kleine oorlog in Nederlands Indië. W.P. van Stockum & Zoon. Den Haag.
 1865. Van Rees WA. De Bandjarmasinsche Krijg van 1859-1863, Arnhem: Thieme.
 1989. Pangeran Shuria Rum. Riwayat Perjuangan Pangeran Hidayatullah. Martapura.

Indonesian monarchs
1822 births
1904 deaths